Yoldia sapotilla, or the short yoldia, is a clam in the family Yoldiidae. It can be found along the Atlantic coast of North America, ranging from Labrador to North Carolina.

References

Yoldiidae
Bivalves described in 1841